This is a list of members of the European Coal and Steel Community Parliament for the Netherlands in the 1952 to 1958 session, ordered by name and by party.

Alphabetical

| style="text-align:left;" colspan="11" | 
|-
! Name
! Sex
! National party
! Period
|-
| style="text-align:left;" | Pieter Blaisse
| style="text-align:left;" | Male
| style="text-align:left;" |  Catholic People's Party
| style="text-align:left;" | 10 September 1952 – 1 January 1958
|-
| style="text-align:left;" | Marinus van der Goes van Naters
| style="text-align:left;" | Male
| style="text-align:left;" |  Labour Party
| style="text-align:left;" | 10 September 1952 – 1 January 1958
|-
| style="text-align:left;" | Cees Hazenbosch
| style="text-align:left;" | Male
| style="text-align:left;" |  Anti-Revolutionary Party
| style="text-align:left;" | 6 May 1955 – 1 January 1958
|-
| style="text-align:left;" | M.M.A.A. Janssen
| style="text-align:left;" | Male
| style="text-align:left;" |  Catholic People's Party
| style="text-align:left;" | 27 November 1956 – 1 January 1958
|-
| style="text-align:left;" | Paul Kapteijn
| style="text-align:left;" | Male
| style="text-align:left;" |  Labour Party
| style="text-align:left;" | 10 September 1952 – 10 October 1956
|-
| style="text-align:left;" | Marga Klompé
| style="text-align:left;" | Female
| style="text-align:left;" |  Catholic People's Party
| style="text-align:left;" | 10 September 1952 – 17 October 1956
|-
| style="text-align:left;" | Henk Korthals
| style="text-align:left;" | Male
| style="text-align:left;" |  People's Party for Freedom and Democracy
| style="text-align:left;" | 10 September 1952 – 1 January 1958
|-
| style="text-align:left;" | Franz Lichtenauer
| style="text-align:left;" | Male
| style="text-align:left;" |  Christian Historical Union
| style="text-align:left;" | 5 November 1957 – 1 January 1958
|-
| style="text-align:left;" | Gerard Nederhorst
| style="text-align:left;" | Male
| style="text-align:left;" |  Labour Party
| style="text-align:left;" | 10 September 1952 – 1 January 1958
|-
| style="text-align:left;" | Willem Rip
| style="text-align:left;" | Male
| style="text-align:left;" |  Anti-Revolutionary Party
| style="text-align:left;" | 10 September 1952 – 1 January 1958
|-
| style="text-align:left;" | Maan Sassen
| style="text-align:left;" | Male
| style="text-align:left;" |  Catholic People's Party
| style="text-align:left;" | 10 September 1952 – 1 January 1958
|-
| style="text-align:left;" | Sieuwert Bruins Slot
| style="text-align:left;" | Male
| style="text-align:left;" |  Anti-Revolutionary Party
| style="text-align:left;" | 10 September 1952 – 22 February 1955
|-
| style="text-align:left;" | Gerrit Vixseboxse
| style="text-align:left;" | Male
| style="text-align:left;" |  Christian Historical Union
| style="text-align:left;" | 10 September 1952 – 10 October 1957
|-style="background-color:#dcdcdc"
| style="text-align:left;" colspan="5" |Source:
|-
|}

By party
Catholic People's Party
Pieter Blaisse, from 10 September 1952 until 1 January 1958 
Marga Klompé, from 10 September 1952 until 17 October 1956  (replaced by M.M.A.A. Janssen) 
Maan Sassen, from 10 September 1952 until 1 January 1958 
M.M.A.A. Janssen, from 27 November 1956 until 1 January 1958 

Anti-Revolutionary Party
Willem Rip, from 10 September 1952 until 1 January 1958 
Sieuwert Bruins Slot, from 10 September 1952 until 22 February 1955  (replaced by Cees Hazenbosch) 
Cees Hazenbosch, from 6 May 1955 until 1 January 1958 

Labour Party
Paul Kapteijn, from 10 September 1952 until 10 October 1956  (replaced by Franz Lichtenauer from the Christian Historical Union) 
Marinus van der Goes van Naters, from 10 September 1952 until 1 January 1958 
Gerard Nederhorst, from 10 September 1952 until 1 January 1958 

Christian Historical Union
Franz Lichtenauer, from 5 November 1957 until 1 January 1958 
Gerrit Vixseboxse, from 10 September 1952 until 10 October 1957 

People's Party for Freedom and Democracy
Henk Korthals, from 10 September 1952 until 1 January 1958

References 

 1952
1952-1958
Netherlands